Briar, Briars, Brier, or Briers may refer to:

 Briar, or brier, common name for a number of unrelated thorny plants that form thicket

People 
 Brier (surname)
 Briers, a surname
 Briars (surname)

Places 
 Briar, Missouri, U.S.
 Briar, Texas, U.S.
 Briars Historic Park, Mount Martha, Victoria, Australia
 The Briars (Georgina), Ontario, Canada, a lakeside resort 
 Brier, Washington, U.S.
 Briers, Mississippi, U.S., a ghost town 
 Brier Island, Nova Scotia, Canada
 Briar Creek (disambiguation), or Brier Creek
 Briar Hill (disambiguation)
 Brier Hill (disambiguation)

Buildings 
 Briars, Saint Helena, a small pavilion in which Napoleon Bonaparte stayed
 The Briars (Natchez, Mississippi), U.S., a historic house 
 The Briars, Wahroonga, Sydney, Australia, a historic house

Fictional characters 
 Briar Moss, from Tamora Pierce's Circle of Magic and Circle Opens quartets
 Briar Cudgeon, in Artemis Fowl
 Briar, the evil sister of Rose in Bone (comics)
 Br'er Rabbit, a central figure in an oral tradition passed down by African-Americans of the Southern United States
 Briar, in the cartoon series Boonie Bears

Other uses
 Briar root, wood from Erica arborea, used for making smoking pipes
Briar, a type of tobacco pipe
 Briar (software), an open-source software communication technology
 Tim Hortons Brier, or the Brier, the Canadian men's curling championship

See also 

Briar Patch (disambiguation)
Briar Rose (disambiguation)
Brière (disambiguation)
Blackbriar (disambiguation)
Greenbrier (disambiguation)
The Briar King, a 2003 novel by Greg Keyes
 Brier score, a probability-related measure